Avery is an unincorporated community in Sarpy County, Nebraska, United States.

History
Avery was laid out on the railroad. A post office was established in Avery in 1891, and remained in operation until it was discontinued in 1908.

References

Unincorporated communities in Sarpy County, Nebraska
Unincorporated communities in Nebraska